Kanwar Amar Jit Singh (born 14 June 1989) is a British non-fungible token (NFT) art dealer and LGBT+ activist.

Education 
Singh was educated at St John's Beaumont School, Charterhouse School and the Licensed Victuallers' School. Numerous articles have described Singh as a Harvard graduate. Singh's 2019 profile in Forbes 30 Under 30 - Europe - Art & Culture, listed a Bachelor of Arts/Science from Harvard University, however by May 2021, the educational section of his profile had been removed.

Career 
In 2016, Singh set up a feminist art gallery called Amar Gallery, in London. The gallery exhibited the work of female artists and feminists including the Guerrilla Girls, Helen Frankenthaler, and Renee Cox. Singh closed his North London gallery in April 2019 and the company was dissolved in October 2021.

In 2019, Singh had stated his next venture, set to open October 2019, was Curated Golden Square, described as a "$100 million, 30,000 square foot apartment hotel". In a 2021 follow up interview with Vanity Fair, Singh claimed that the COVID-19 pandemic was the reason the venture did not move forward. The site in question, 37 Golden Square, is a collection of 23 apartments developed by Halamar in 2019.

In November 2021, Artnet claimed that the value of Singh's NFT deals was in excess of $300 million. Business Insider claimed that Singh's NFT art gallery booked $9.8 million in revenue in 2021. In February 2022, Vanity Fair claimed that Singh had secured $500 million of NFT deals in the prior 12 months, and was on track to secure $1 billion in NFT deals by 2024. In June 2022, PinkNews claimed that Singh's wholly owned NFT studio was worth over $150 million.

Philanthropy
In 2021, Singh pledged to donate $5 million worth of art by female, LGBTQ and minority artists to museums worldwide by 2025. In January 2021, Singh donated a painting worth six figures celebrating women by the artist María Berrío to Los Angeles County Museum of Art, and a portrait of inaugural poet Amanda Gorman to Harvard University's permanent collection, valued at £8,000. Singh claims he reached $5 million of donations by July 2022.

In June 2021, Singh partnered with Givenchy and VeVe to raise $128,000 for LGBT+ youth movement Le MAG Jeunes LGBT+, by collaborating with artists Rewind Collective and selling the first NFT created for a beauty brand.

In 2022, he pledged to donate $1 million over two years to non-governmental organization Vital Voices.

He is a patron of the Tate, Serpentine Galleries and Whitechapel Gallery, and a member of the Los Angeles County Museum of Art collectors committee.

Activism
Singh has worked alongside the LGBT+ community in India to fight for equal rights, and through his gallery also mounted LGBT+ exhibitions including Links by artist Howard Tangye and Section 377, an online exhibition celebrating the road to India legalising homosexuality. Alongside Prince Manvendra Singh Gohil and other LGBT+ activists, Singh has called for the Indian government to strike down Section 377, legalise same-sex marriage and same-sex adoption, and ban LGBT conversion therapy practices.

In July 2019 Singh spoke at the Congressional Hispanic Leadership Institute's Annual Future Leaders Conference, held at the Russell Senate Office Building, about women's rights and how communities are impacted through art and culture.

Ancestry
Singh is a descendant of Raja Nihal Singh of Kapurthala. In 2017, Singh was 16th in line to the former throne of Kapurthala, one of 565 princely states which existed during the British Raj, and which was abolished in 1947 following Indian independence.

A 2017 Los Angeles Blade article incorrectly reported that Indian politician Vishvjit Singh was Singh's paternal uncle; Vishvjit was in fact Singh's paternal grandfather's nephew. A 2022 Esquire interview with Singh contained the incorrect assertion that Indian Health Minister Amrit Kaur was Singh's grandmother; Kaur never married and died without children.

References

1989 births
Living people
People educated at Charterhouse School
People educated at Licensed Victuallers' School
British LGBT rights activists
British people of Indian descent